The 2015 SuisseGas Gran Premio di Lugano was the 69th edition of the Gran Premio di Lugano road cycling race. The race took place on 1 March 2015 on a loop around the city of Lugano, Switzerland, starting and finishing on the shore of Lake Lugano. The defending champion from the 2014 Gran Premio di Lugano was Mauro Finetto.

While the terrain of the race was not particularly difficult, it was considered likely that the race would be fairly selective because the race came so early in the season, when riders were not in their best form. The most challenging climb was expected to be that of Collina d'Oro.

The race was won by Niccolò Bonifazio in a sprint.

Teams 

14 teams were selected to take part; four were UCI WorldTeams, nine were Professional Continental teams and one was a Continental team. With eight riders per team allowed to enter the race, the maximum number of riders was 112.

WorldTeams

Professional Continental teams

Continental teams

Race report 

The early part of the race saw a 17-man breakaway form. The chase group caught Coppel and Brüngger, and Daniel Teklehaimanot made a solo attack, but after  the race was brought back together.  led the pace through the final lap of the race, with Ivan Basso attacking on the climb. The climb, however, was shortened by roadworks and Basso was not able to build a sufficient lead. The race therefore came down to a sprint, and Niccolò Bonifazio took his first win of the year. Francesco Gavazzi was second with Matteo Montaguti the third Italian rider on the podium.

Race result

References

External links 

 

Gran Premio di Lugano
Gran Premio di Lugano
Gran Premio di Lugano